Vanity is a 1927, American silent drama film directed by Donald Crisp and starring Leatrice Joy. The film was written by Douglas Doty, produced by DeMille Pictures Corporation and distributed by Producers Distributing Corporation.

Cast
Leatrice Joy as Barbara Fiske
Charles Ray as Lt. Lloyd Van Courtland
Alan Hale as 'Happy' Dan Morgan
Mayme Kelso as Mrs. Fiske
Noble Johnson as Bimbo, ship's cook
Helen Lee Worthing as Tess Ramsay
Louis Payne as Butler

Production
Leatrice Joy had impulsively cut her hair short in 1926, and Cecil B. DeMille, whom Joy had followed when he set up Producers Distributing Corporation, was publicly angry as it prevented her from portraying traditional feminine roles. The studio developed projects with roles suitable for her “Leatrice Joy bob”, and Vanity was the final of five films shot before she regrew her hair. Despite this, a professional dispute would end the Joy / Demille partnership in 1928.

Preservation
A copy of Vanity is held by The Library of Congress.

References

External links
 
 
 Lobby or window card
 Lobby card and still at silenthollywood.com
 

1927 films
1927 drama films
American silent feature films
American black-and-white films
Films directed by Donald Crisp
Producers Distributing Corporation films
1920s American films
Silent American drama films
1920s English-language films